John Ogilvy of Powrie (died 1609) was a Scottish landowner and political agent.

He was known as "Pury Ogilvie" from the family lands. The lands were at Easter Powrie, the ruined Powrie Castle was part of the estate of Wester Powrie. His father, Gilbert Ogilvy, sold Easter Powrie to James Durham of Pitkerro in 1593. The castle at Easter Powrie was later named Wedderburn Castle, and demolished in the 19th-century.

John Ogilvy's sister Anne Ogilvy married the courtier Sir Thomas Erskine. He married Elizabeth Scrimgeour, a daughter of Sir James Scrimgeour, Constable of Dundee. His father Gilbert Ogilvy died in 1600, and John wrote to the Bishop of Durham asking for black cloth for mourning clothes.

Ogilgvy sent political information to Francis Walsingham, and 1595 pretended to be an agent of James VI to Catholic powers in Europe.

In October 1598 James VI was convinced that Ogilvy had leaked or passed invented diplomat instructions to England purporting to be his directions for diplomats in Spain and at the Vatican. Elizabeth I had confronted the Scottish diplomat David Foulis with these disputed papers.

Ogilvy was questioned in March 1601, briefly imprisoned in Edinburgh Castle, and after going to Dunfermline to see the king, went into exile in England.

Ogilvie sent news of the Scottish court to Sir Robert Cecil in England, assuming the name "John Gibson". Ogilvy peppered his letters with Latin quotations from the classics. He refers to himself as "PO". He described the factions at court of the adherents of James VI and his wife Anne of Denmark. In May 1601, he reported that Anne of Denmark was angry with his brother-in-law, Sir Thomas Erskine because of jealousy, like Juno's after the Judgement of Paris, or because Erskine supported Sir George Home and Sir David Murray, who she counted as enemies. Ogilvie's troubles included a quarrel over property with his wife and father-in-law. He was staying in Northumberland with Oliver Ogle at Burradon and Causey Park.

He wrote to James VI referring to the meeting at Dunfermline, and claiming not to have had underhand dealings abroad.

John Ogilvy died in 1609.

His daughter Isobel Ogilvy married Kenneth Mackenzie

References

1609 deaths
Court of James VI and I